02 is a studio album released by South Korean group Urban Zakapa. The lead single is "I Hate You" (Hangul: ""). "River" and "All The Same" ("") were pre-released. The album was nominated on 10th Korean Music Awards as Best R&B and Soul Album  and licensed by Avex Taiwan as Taiwan exclusive version, same as 02.

Track listing

Charts

Sales and certifications

References

2012 albums
Urban Zakapa albums